James Richard Cook (1944 – January 13, 2022) was an American author of novels and stories.

Personal life and death
James Richard Cook was born in 1944.  In the Society for Creative Anachronism, where he co-founded the Kingdom of Atenveldt, he was known as Sir Richard Ironsteed.  Cook died on January 13, 2022.

Published works

Articles
, Locus listed five articles published by Cook:
 
 
 
 
 With

Stories
, Locus listed 13 stories published by Cook:
 
 
 
 
 
 
 
 
 
 With   (Nominated for the 1995 Theodore Sturgeon Award)
 With 
 With

Novels
, Locus listed eight books published by Cook:

References

External links
 
 
 

1944 births
2022 deaths
20th-century American male writers
20th-century American novelists
20th-century American short story writers
American fantasy writers
American male novelists
American male short story writers